Lee Township is a township in Madison County, Iowa, in the United States.

History
Lee Township was originally called Badger Township, and under the latter name was established in 1857. It was renamed Lee in 1858, in honor of Harvey Lee, a pioneer settler.

References

Townships in Madison County, Iowa
Townships in Iowa
1857 establishments in Iowa